The 2010 Armor All Gold Coast 600 was the eleventh event of the 2010 V8 Supercar Championship Series. It was held on the weekend of 22 to 24 October at the Surfers Paradise Street Circuit in Queensland. V8 Supercars became the naming right category of the event for the first time in 2010 after racing as a support category for international open wheel racing for many of the previous Surfers Paradise events. In 2009 V8 Supercar were the leading category but not the naming rights category as that had been previously marketed as a double header with A1 Grand Prix who failed to arrive.

In an altered format for 2010 the races would take place over two  races with a driver change in the first time a third co-driver event was held in an Australian touring car season since 1990. In an effort to keep the events former international flavour each V8 Supercar team has employed a driver with an 'international reputation' with many drivers coming from the IndyCar Series and the World Touring Car Championship.

Race 21
Chaos erupted at the start. Cameron McConville launched away from Garth Tander's pole position, but crept on the line and would be assigned a ten-second pit penalty for a jumped start. Jacques Villeneuve, also to be penalised for a too quick start, and Luke Youlden collided at the first corner, with Villeneuve then spinning in front of the pack at the second corner after contact with Greg Ritter, causing damage to several cars. Will Davison stopped on the first lap after contact with the spinning Villeneuve. Dean Fiore also pulled in on the opening lap with Will Power an early stopper after losing all of his cars oil.

McConville led the early laps with Michael Caruso climbing through the field into second place. Steve Owen also climbed through the field into third ahead of Warren Luff. Repeated spoiler damage by Tiago Monteiro caused his retirement.

On lap 70 Garth Tander was assigned a mechanical black flag, it was assumed for a fuel leak, but as it transpired to be a leak from Tander's drink bottle the flag was withdrawn. Subsequently, Tander's car shed a headlight cluster into the path of pursuing cars to no penalty, causing controversy amongst team principals and officials in the pits.

Courtney took the lead from Tander just prior to a safety car being called for Andrew Thompson, parked in the first chicane. Immediately at the lap 84 restart, Greg Murphy and Todd Kelly stopped in the second corner after Kelly spun.

Teammates Jason Bright and Jason Richards tangled on another safety car restart on lap 97, shortly after race leader James Courtney was penalised a drive-through for slowing down after the safety car pulled away from the queue.

Garth Tander pulled out to win from Craig Lowndes and Shane van Gisbergen. Michael Caruso finished fourth from Alex Davison, Jamie Whincup and Jason Bright.

Race 22
Steven Richards outlaunched teammate polesitter Luke Youlden to lead at the start as Greg Ritter crawled away all but stalling. Alain Menu was also slow away and stopped on the track, bringing out the safety car.

At the restart there was contact between Cameron McConville and David Brabham, sending Brabham into the wall hard.

At the second restart Richards started to build a gap over Youlden and Warren Luff. Steve Owen and Michael Caruso quickly pushed past Youlden and Luff.

Safety car emerged again for the stopped car of Andrew Thompson. The safety car emerged again on lap 33 for debris on the circuit as Jack Perkins scraped a door skin off his car at the top of the circuit.

Andrew Jones had an exhaust problem and slowed on the front straight to allow his pitcrew to examine the car as he passed. Three cars came past at differing speeds. Scott Dixon swung to the inside to get around the slowing cars in front as they checked their speed to begin their first safety car lap. Dixon struck the slow moving Jones, tearing the right rear corner from Jones' Commodore and damaging the front left corner of his own Commodore, putting both out of the race.

Steven Johnson was shortly afterward put into the wall after contact with Rick Kelly.

The final laps saw a close dice between Jamie Whincup and Shane van Gisbergen which became a physical clash on the final lap into the first chicane. Whincup held out the charging Van Gisbergen, with Mark Winterbottom crossing for third just behind.

Entry list
source:

International driver trophy Points

Standings
 After 20 of 26 races.

References

External links
Official website
Official timing and results
Official series website

Armor All Gold Coast 600
Sport on the Gold Coast, Queensland